Simon Stuart can refer to:
Simon Stuart (general), Australian Army officer
Simon Stuart (conservationist) (born 1967), senior conservationist closely associated with IUCN's Species Survival Commission

See also
 Simon Steward (1575–1632), English politician
 Simon Stewart (disambiguation)
 Simeon Stuart (1864–1939), British film actor